The 2015 Toyota Owners 400 was a NASCAR Sprint Cup Series race held at Richmond International Raceway in Richmond, Virginia. It was scheduled to be held on April 25, 2015, but was run on April 26, 2015 due to rain. Contested over 400 laps on the 0.75 mile (1.2 km) D-shaped short track, it was the ninth race of the 2015 NASCAR Sprint Cup season. Kurt Busch won the race, his first of the season, while teammate Kevin Harvick finished runner-up. Jimmie Johnson, Jamie McMurray and Joey Logano rounded out the top five.

Joey Logano won the pole for the race. He led 94 laps on his way to a fifth-place finish. Kurt Busch led a race high of 291 laps. The race had twelve lead changes among five different drivers, as well as eight caution flag periods for 53 laps.

This was the 26th career victory for Kurt Busch, second at Richmond International Raceway and first at the track for Stewart-Haas Racing. The win moved Busch up to 18th in the points standings. Chevrolet left Richmond with a 29-point lead over Ford in the manufacturer standings.

The Toyota Owners 400 was carried by Fox Sports on the broadcast Fox network for the American television audience. The radio broadcast for the race was carried by the Motor Racing Network and Sirius XM NASCAR Radio.

Report

Background

Richmond International Raceway (RIR) is a 3/4-mile (1.2 km), D-shaped, asphalt race track located just outside Richmond, Virginia in Henrico County. It hosts the NASCAR Sprint Cup Series and Xfinity Series.  "America's Premier Short Track" formerly hosted a NASCAR Camping World Truck Series race, a Verizon IndyCar Series race, and two USAC sprint car races.

Kevin Harvick entered Richmond with a 30-point lead over Joey Logano. Martin Truex Jr. entered 33 back. Jimmie Johnson entered 56 back. Brad Keselowski entered 59 back.

Changes to the track
Following an incident from last year's Federated Auto Parts 400, Richmond International Raceway has added metal barriers and more security personnel to prevent fans from scaling the catch fence during the race. With 71 laps to go in last September's race, a man identified as James Dennis climbed to the top of the catch fence overhead of turn 4. This forced David Hoots, competition director for the Sprint Cup Series, to put the race under caution. "It's frustrating and unfortunate," Dennis Bickmeier, track president of Richmond, said Friday. "I was very adamant after hearing about it that fans don't do that. A fan doesn't disrupt an event. You respect it."

Entry list
The entry list for the Toyota Owners 400 was released on Monday, April 20, 2015 at 11:23 a.m. Eastern time. Forty-five cars were entered for the race. Chase Elliott attempted to make his second career Sprint Cup Series start in the No. 25 Hendrick Motorsports Chevrolet. Ron Hornaday Jr. was on the initial entry list, but The Motorsports Group decided to replace him in the No. 30 Chevrolet, which was driven by Jeff Green who attempted to make his first start since the 2011 Lenox Industrial Tools 301 at New Hampshire Motor Speedway. Reed Sorenson drove the No. 34 Front Row Motorsports Ford that had been driven by Chris Buescher.

Practice

First practice

Final practice

Qualifying

If you can’t get a pole you want it to be your teammate so I am happy that he was able to get it done.” Jeb Burton and Brendan Gaughan failed to qualify for the race. Just before the race, BK Racing announced that Burton will drive the No. 23 car in place of teammate J. J. Yeley. Because of the driver change, Jeb Burton started the race from the rear of the field.

Qualifying results

Race
The race was scheduled to start at 7:14 p.m. Eastern time, but the threat of bad weather moved the start up to 7:05 p.m. It was all for naught, however. NASCAR made the decision to postpone the race to Sunday at 1:16 p.m.

First half

Start
The race started at 1:19 p.m. with Joey Logano leading the field to the green flag. With all the rubber being washed away by the rain, the cars were primarily running the bottom groove. Coming out of turn 4 on lap 4, Danica Patrick got hit by Casey Mears and about spun out. She saved the car and the race remained green. Logano caught the end of the field ten laps into the race. By lap 21, Kurt Busch began reeling in the leader. By lap 42, Busch, his teammate Kevin Harvick, and Martin Truex Jr. pulled within a second of Logano. The first caution of the day flew on lap 51. This was a planned competition caution for overnight rain. The top ten in the running order entering pit road would've remained the same exiting, but Jamie McMurray, who was running eighth, had to make another pit stop for loose lug nuts. He restarted the race in 30th position.

The race restarted on lap 57. After 40 laps, Busch pulled up to the leader. Using the lapped car of Josh Wise as a pick, Busch passed to the inside of Logano to take the lead on lap 96. The second caution flew on lap 124 when Joey Gase, coming off turn 2, got turned by Aric Almirola and hit inside backstretch wall head-on. Busch swapped the lead with Harvick on pit road with his teammate pitting before the start/finish line. Busch, however, exited pit road with the lead.

Trouble for Josh Wise
The race restarted on lap 137. The third caution flew the next lap for Wise's car had stalled at the exit of pit road.

The race restarted on lap 144. The fourth caution race flew on lap 163 when Wise blew an engine. Having just rejoined the race, his No. 98 Ford went up in smoke while going into turn 1. Busch swapped the lead with Harvick on pit road. This time, however, it was Harvick who exited with the lead.

Second half

Halfway
The race restarted on lap 171 and Busch immediately took back the lead. The race went through a long green flag run with everyone settling into a rhythm. McMurray, who restarted the race earlier in 30th, eventually ran Busch down. and took the lead on lap 260. He gave it back to Busch the next lap and took it back the lap after that. While McMurrary and Busch fought for the lead, many cars began hitting pit road. McMurray gave up the lead to pit on lap 266 and gave it to Brad Keselowski. Brett Moffitt had a tire going flat and slammed the wall in turn 1. This brought out the 5th caution on lap 270. Trevor Bayne also had a tire going flat and hit the wall in turn 4. To add insult to injury for Moffitt, he was forced to restart the race from the tail-end of the field for having too many men over the wall. Fifteen cars took the waive-around, most of whom were cars running in the top ten when the caution came out.

Fourth quarter

The race restarted on lap 279 with Busch still in the lead. After a nearly 60 lap green run, debris in turn 3 brought out the sixth caution of the race with 50 laps to go. Kurt Busch exited pit road first to maintain the lead. Jeb Burton was forced to drop to the tail-end of the field for an uncontrolled tire.

The race restarted with 42 laps to go. The seventh caution of the race flew with 41 laps to go when Tony Stewart went spinning on the front stretch. Coming to the line, Stewart made contact with Dale Earnhardt Jr., went spinning and made contact with the inside pit wall towards turn 1. “I don’t know," Dale said after the race. "You’ll have to ask him. He hit me in the left-rear quarter panel. I was trying to clear the 51 on the outside of me, so I was as high as I could go. You’ll have to ask him.” "I mean, he hit me right here. I ain't got that good of a peripheral vision. Pretty good, but not that good. Well, it's never his fault. I was doing everything I needed to do. I didn't drive under, I didn't drive into him, I didn't move my line at all. He's gotta take a little ownership in what happened there."

The race restarted with 33 laps to go and caution flew for the eighth time when Jeb Burton got turned on the backstretch. He was rear-ended by Sam Hornish Jr. exiting turn 2.

The race restarted with 26 laps to go and Kurt Busch drove off scoring the 26th victory of his career.

Post-race

Driver comments
“It’s an incredible feeling,” said Busch. “It’s a total team effort. And the way that everything came together just seemed like we were building and building and building towards a great finish like this. And I have this opportunity because of Gene Haas and everybody that’s part of our family at Stewart-Haas. It’s an unbelievable feeling when you pull deep from within and you go through troubles and you know, when you’re accused of something and things go sideways, your personal life doesn’t need to affect your business life.”

Race results

Race statistics
12 lead changes among 5 different drivers
8 cautions for 53 laps
Time of race: 3 hours, 05 minutes, 16 seconds
Average speed: 
Kurt Busch took home $221,240 in winnings

Race awards
 Coors Light Pole Award: Joey Logano (21.248)
 3M Lap Leader: Kurt Busch (291 laps)
 American Ethanol Green Flag Restart Award: Kurt Busch (22.082)
 Duralast Brakes "Bake In The Race" Award: Joey Logano
 Freescale "Wide Open": Jimmie Johnson
 Ingersoll Rand Power Move: Ryan Newman (5 positions)
 MAHLE Clevite Engine Builder of the Race: Hendrick Engines, #41
 Mobil 1 Driver of the Race: Kurt Busch (148.1 driver rating)
 Moog Steering and Suspension Problem Solver of The Race: Jamie McMurray (crew chief Matt McCall (-0.069))
 NASCAR Sprint Cup Leader Bonus: No winner: rolls over to $60,000 at next event
 Sherwin-Williams Fastest Lap: A. J. Allmendinger (Lap 4, 21.659 )
 Sunoco Rookie of The Race: Brett Moffitt

Media

Television
Fox Sports covered their 15th race at Richmond International Raceway. Mike Joy, Larry McReynolds and six-time Richmond winner Darrell Waltrip had the call in the booth for the race. Jamie Little, Chris Neville and Matt Yocum handled the pit road duties for the television side.

Radio
MRN had the radio call for the race, which was simulcast on Sirius XM NASCAR Radio. Joe Moore and Jeff Striegle called the race in the booth when the field was racing down the front stretch. Mike Bagley called the race from a platform inside of turn 3 on the backstretch when the field was racing down the backstretch. Alex Hayden, Winston Kelley and Steve Post worked pit road for MRN.

Standings after the race

Drivers' Championship standings

Manufacturers' Championship standings

Note: Only the first sixteen positions are included for the driver standings.

Notes

References

VMI Keydets bask Virginia
Toyota Owners 400
NASCAR races at Richmond Raceway